Welcome To The Next Level is the final EP from Dirty District. "No Head" has a vocal contribution from Miguel, who later performed vocals in Ethnician. "Payback" was a  return to the early reggae and punk roots, "Speech Over" is also very Ethnician-esque, complete with a sample from a Steve Biko speech; the next track is a remake of Life In The Dirty District's NY Crap and is  more psychedelic and heavier, Hear Them is very a relaxed song and more indie rock inspired, and the closing song is a cover of the Prodigy's "The Horns Of Jericho", which is from their debut, Experience.

Track listing
 No Head
 Payback
 Speech Over
 N.Y Crap
 Hear Them
 Jericho

References

Dirty District albums
1996 albums